Big Mountain Branch is a  long 2nd order tributary to Aarons Creek in Halifax County, Virginia.

Course 
Big Mountain Branch rises at Red Bank, Virginia, and then flows generally southeast to join Aarons Creek about 1 mile northwest of Nelson.

Watershed 
Big Mountain Branch drains  of area, receives about 45.5 in/year of precipitation, has a wetness index of 394.71, and is about 46% forested.

See also 
 List of Virginia Rivers

References 

Rivers of Virginia
Rivers of Halifax County, Virginia
Tributaries of the Roanoke River